Adam Oliver (born 25 October 1980) is an English former professional footballer who played as a midfielder.

Career
Born in West Bromwich, Oliver made 23 appearances in the Football League for West Bromwich Albion, scoring one goal, his strike coming in a dramatic 4–4 draw with Bolton Wanderers in April 2000. He made a further four appearances in Cup competitions. After recovering from life-threatening kidney disease, Oliver retired at the age of 21 following recurring knee injuries.

Oliver made one appearance at the 1999 FIFA World Youth Championship.

Career statistics
Source:

References

1980 births
Living people
English footballers
West Bromwich Albion F.C. players
English Football League players
Sportspeople from West Bromwich
England youth international footballers
Association football midfielders